Calotype Club may refer to:

Edinburgh Calotype Club, (c. 1843- ), the first photographic club in the world.
Calotype Society (London), (c. 1848- ), dancing in part to become the Royal Photographic Society.